Zyzzyva  is a genus of South American weevils, often found on or near palm trees. It was first described in 1922 by Thomas Lincoln Casey, Jr., based on specimens obtained in Brazil by Herbert Huntingdon Smith. 

Casey describes Zyzzyva ochreotecta in his book Memoirs on the Coleoptera, Volume 10:  

Zyzzyva has achieved notoriety for being the last word in several English-language dictionaries.  Casey is commonly credited with naming the genus, although the etymology of the word is unclear.  One theory is that the word was inspired by Zyzza, a former genus of leafhoppers.  An entomologist at New York's Museum of Natural History speculated that Casey made up the word as a joke, "to have the last word."

See also 
 Aaaaba
 Aaadonta
 Zyzzogeton, a leafhopper, another "last entry"
 Zyzzyxdonta alata
 Zyzzyzus
 Zzyzx (disambiguation)

References 

Baridinae genera
Taxa named by Thomas Lincoln Casey Jr.